The 2005 Scottish Liberal Democrats leadership election was an election to choose a new leader of the Liberal Democrats in Scotland, triggered following the resignation of Jim Wallace. Two candidates were nominated. The 4,500 members were polled. The declaration of results occurred on 23 June 2005. Nicol Stephen was elected. The previous leader Jim Wallace was elected unopposed in 1992 after the resignation of Malcolm Bruce.

Candidates

Successfully nominated candidates
The following MSPs gained the required one nomination from a fellow MSP, and were therefore candidates for the leadership:

Nicol Stephen- MSP for Aberdeen South and Transport minister
Mike Rumbles - MSP for West Aberdeenshire and Kincardine and Lib Dem spokesperson on health

Result
The result of the leadership election was announced on 23 June 2005; turnout of the 4,500 Lib Dem membership was 65%.

References

2005 in Scotland
2000s elections in Scotland
2005 elections in the United Kingdom
2005
Scottish Liberal Democrats leadership election